Menzel Chaker is a very old town in the countryside of Sfax, Tunisia, formerly known as Triaga. It is noticed for its production of olives and other fruits, vegetables and produces as Olive Oil.

It is in Sfax delegation, which is in the Sfax Governorate, and nowadays, it contains nearly 2214 people.

The town served a real function in the Tunisian French war (1881-1956) and during the construction of the state (1956-1964).

References

Populated places in Sfax Governorate
Communes of Tunisia